Ladislav Kuna (3 April 1947 – 1 February 2012) was a Slovak football player and manager, who played as a central midfielder.

He played 424 matches and scored 86 goals in the Czechoslovak First League, all for Spartak Trnava. His number of appearances in the Czechoslovak First League was previously the record, and was only bettered by Přemysl Bičovský. 

Kuna was capped 47 times for Czechoslovakia, scoring nine goals. He was a participant in the 1970 FIFA World Cup. In 1969, he was named Czechoslovak Footballer of the Year.

He was the chairman of Spartak Trnava from 2006 until his death in February 2012.

Honours

Player
Spartak Trnava
 Czechoslovak First League
 Winners (5): 1968, 1969, 1971, 1972, 1973
 Czechoslovak Cup
 Winners (3): 1967, 1971, 1975
 Slovak Cup
 Winners (2): 1971, 1975
 Mitropa Cup
 Winners (1): 1967
 Runner-up (1): 1968
Individual
Czechoslovak Footballer of the Year (1): 1969

References

External link

 

1947 births
2012 deaths
Slovak footballers
Czechoslovak footballers
FC Spartak Trnava players
1970 FIFA World Cup players
Czechoslovakia international footballers
Slovak football managers
FC DAC 1904 Dunajská Streda managers
AS Trenčín managers
FC Spartak Trnava managers
People from Hlohovec
Sportspeople from the Trnava Region
Czechoslovak expatriate footballers
Expatriate footballers in Austria
Czechoslovak expatriate sportspeople in Austria
1. Wiener Neustädter SC managers
Association football midfielders